Ice flower may refer to:
 Window frost
 Frost flower, thin layers of ice extruded from a plant